Paul Ngologoza OBE, KSG (1897–1984) was a Ugandan writer of Kigezi and Its People. He was born at Rwanyena, in Rubaya (now in Kabale District), in then Kigezi District.  He wrote about the people of Kigezi, which originally comprised the present districts of  Kabale, Kanungu, Kisoro and Rukungiri. He wrote the book, despite having had no formal education. He retired in 1960.

See also
Kigezi
Rukiga
Bakiga

References

1897 births
1984 deaths
Officers of the Order of the British Empire
People from Kabale District
Ugandan non-fiction writers
20th-century non-fiction writers